Cezanjevci (in older sources Cezanjovci) is a village on the right bank of the Ščavnica River in the Municipality of Ljutomer in northeastern Slovenia. The area traditionally belonged to the Styria region and is now included in the Mura Statistical Region.

The local parish church in the settlement is dedicated to Saint Roch and Saint Sebastian and belongs to the Roman Catholic Diocese of Murska Sobota. It is a single-nave building built in 1675. The belfry was added in 1679.

References

External links
Cezanjevci on Geopedia

Populated places in the Municipality of Ljutomer